A special election was held in  on January 15, 1801 to fill a vacancy left by the death of Thomas Hartley (F) on December 21, 1800

Election results

Stewart took his seat February 3, 1801.  Stewart had also won the general elections in 1800.

References

Pennsylvania 1801 08
Pennsylvania 1801 08
1801 08
Pennsylvania 08
United States House of Representatives 08
United States House of Representatives 1801 08